Braun GmbH ( "brown") is a German consumer products company founded in 1921 and based in Kronberg im Taunus.  The company is particularly well known for its industrial product design from the mid-20th century which included electric shavers and record players.

From 1984 until 2007, Braun was a wholly owned subsidiary of The Gillette Company, which had purchased a controlling interest in the company in 1967. Braun is now a wholly owned subsidiary of Procter & Gamble, which acquired Gillette in 2005.

History 
In 1921,  (1890–1951), a mechanical engineer, established a small engineering shop in Frankfurt, Germany. In 1923, he began producing components for radio sets. By 1928, the company had grown to such an extent, partly due to the use of certain plastic materials, that it moved to new premises on Idsteiner Strasse.

In 1929, eight years after he started his shop, Max Braun began to manufacture entire radio sets. Soon after, Braun became one of Germany's leading radio manufacturers. This development continued with the launch of one of the first combined radio and record players in 1932.

In 1935, the Braun brand was introduced, and the original incarnation of the logotype with the raised "A" was born. At the 1937 World's Fair in Paris, Max Braun received the award For special achievements in phonography. During World War II, Braun was compelled to more or less abandon products for the civilian sector. In 1944, the Frankfurt factories were almost entirely destroyed, and Max Braun began to rebuild his company.

After the war, Braun continued to produce state-of-the art radios and audio equipment, and the company soon became well known for its "high-fidelity" audio and record players, including the famous SK line. Braun was the only foreign licensee of the QUAD electrostatic loudspeaker for a time. In 1954, the company also began producing film slide projectors, a mainstay of its business for the next forty years. By 1956, Braun was marketing the first fully automatic tray film slide projector, the PA 1. Braun AG slide projectors all utilized a linear or straight tray as opposed to a round-tray design, which allowed the projector to remain small and compact.

The 1950s also marked the beginning of the product that Braun is most known for today: the electric shaver. The S 50 was the first electric shaver from Braun. The shaver was designed in 1938, but World War II delayed its introduction until 1951. It featured an oscillating cutter block with a very thin, yet very stable steel-foil mounted above it.

The 1950s also saw the start of kitchen appliances, like the mixer MX 3 and the kitchen machine (Küchenmaschine or kitchen machine) Braun KM 3. The KM 3 is a family of food processors which started with the model KM 3/31 in 1957. Designed by Gerd A. Müller, these machines were built in nearly unchanged form for 36 years, until 1993.

In 1962, Braun became Braun AG, a publicly traded company. In 1963, the company started distributing microphones by U.S. manufacturer Shure in Germany. Also during the 1960s, Braun created the Rams-designed T3 pocket radio. By this time, Braun's film slide projectors were featuring high-quality optics and all-metal construction combined with sleek functionalist styling, and competed with higher-end Eastman Kodak and Leitz products in the global market. Braun also started distributing in Germany high-end medium-format SLR system-cameras produced by Japanese camera manufacturer Zenza Bronica, as well as Braun-Nizo brand cameras and Super 8 film cameras (formerly of Niezoldi & Krämer GmbH; purchased by Braun in 1962). In 1967, a majority share of the company was acquired by the Boston, Massachusetts-based conglomerate Gillette Group.

Erwin Braun, one of Max Braun's sons, took on the sales agency of the LECTRON system product line in 1967. He was very interested in making the teaching of electronics approachable to students all over the world. The LECTRON system was a simple but ingenious product which fit the bill perfectly. The LECTRON System was introduced to the German marketplace in 1966 by Egger-Bahn (a company primarily focused on the 9mm toy train sector). An electronic component such as a resistor was placed inside a transparent flat cube with a white cover on the top of which had the electronic symbol and its value. The blocks containing different components and types of connections could be put together to form a working circuit with the schematic diagram of the circuit illustrated by the symbols on the top of the block. The blocks were held together with the use of magnets behind the conductive plates on the sides and bottom of the block. In 1972, due to pressure from Gillette, the LECTRON assets were sold off to Manfred Walter, the manager of the LECTRON product line at Braun. Mr. Walter formed Lectron, GmbH in 1972 to continue selling and developing the LECTRON product line. Mr. Walter retired and gifted the LECTRON assets to the Reha-Werkstatt Oberrad in 2001. The RWO continues to manufacture and sell the LECTRON system to this day.

By the 1970s, Braun discontinued its line of film slide projectors and hi-fi products to focus on home consumer appliances, including shavers, razors, coffee makers, clocks, and radios.

In 1981, the company's audio and hi-fidelity division, which grew out of Braun's former core business of radios, turntables, and hi-fidelity audio products, was spun off into Braun Electronic GmbH, a legally independent Gillette subsidiary. Braun Electronic GmbH put out its last audio-fi set in 1990 before the business was discontinued. Also in the early 1980s, Braun sold its photographic and slide projector division to Robert Bosch GmbH.

In 1982, Gillette Group moved to integrate Braun with the parent company by taking full control over its operations. In 1984, Braun ceased the production of cigarette lighters. That same year, Braun became a wholly owned subsidiary of Gillette.

By the mid-1990s, Braun held a leading position among the world's home appliance manufacturers, but profitability concerns began to surface. Many of Braun's competitors closely imitated Braun designs and had them produced in low-cost labor countries at lower costs. The litigation commenced by the company to reverse the sales losses and damage to its product image cost Braun substantial amounts of money.

In 1998, Gillette decided to transform Braun AG into a private company before it bought back a 19.9 percent share in its subsidiary The Gillette Company Inc., which Braun had acquired in 1988. The following year, Braun's sales organization was merged with those of Gillette's other business divisions to cut costs. At the end of the 1990s, Braun and Gillette suffered losses in several areas. Looking for ways to return to profitability, Gillette considering the disposal of some of Braun's less profitable divisions, such as kitchen appliances and thermometers, but abandoned the idea a few months later when no buyers were found. Braun's sales in those areas began to recover in 2000.

Gillette was acquired by Procter & Gamble ("P&G") in 2005, making Braun a wholly owned subsidiary of P&G. In 2006 Procter & Gamble sold Braun's Health Products division to Kaz, now a subsidiary of Helen of Troy Limited, along with licensing the use of Braun's trademark in the specific health products market. In early 2008, P&G discontinued sales of Braun appliances, except certain appliances such as shavers and electric toothbrushes, in the United States market. Elsewhere, however, Braun kept selling all its core categories until 2012, when the Braun product line relating to kitchen appliances was purchased by De'Longhi, using the Braun trademark under license from P&G.

Products

Braun's products include the following categories:

 Shaving and grooming (electric shaving, hair trimming, beard trimming)
 Oral care (now under the Oral-B brand)
 Beauty care (hair care and epilation)
 Health and wellness (ear thermometers, blood pressure monitors) (out-licensed)
 Food and drink preparation (coffee makers, coffee grinders, toasters, blenders, juicers) (out-licensed)
 Irons (out-licensed)
 Clocks, watches and calculators (out-licensed)

The company was formerly a manufacturer of food processors, radios, slide projectors, Super 8 film cameras and accessories, and high-fidelity sound systems.

Today, Braun focuses on its core categories (shaving and grooming, beauty and hair care). Household Small Appliances, Health and wellness category as well as clocks and watches are now run by other companies (De'Longhi, Zeon, Kaz) under licence.

Design department
From the mid-1950s, the Braun brand was closely linked with the concept of German modern industrial design and its combination of functionality and technology. In 1956, Braun created its first design department, headed by Dr. Fritz Eichler, who instituted a collaboration with the Ulm School of Design to develop a new product line. In 1956 the company introduced its famous SK4 record player ("Snow White's Coffin"), designed by a youthful Dieter Rams together with Herbert Lindinger and the pioneer of system design, Hans Gugelot, then lecturer of design at the Ulm School of Design. Rams soon became the most influential designer at Braun. Rams was a key figure in the German design renaissance of the late 1950s and 1960s. Eventually becoming head of Braun's design staff, Rams' influence was soon evidenced in many products. Braun's famous SK 4 record player and the high-quality "D"-series (D25–D47) of 35mm slide projectors are some of the better examples of Functionalist design.

Another 'icon' of modern design, but less well known, is the electrostatic loudspeaker unit BRAUN LE1, the electronics were licensed from QUAD. Dieter Rams and Dietrich Lubs are also responsible for the classic range of Braun alarm clocks, collaborating first on the design Phase I, Phase II, and Phase III  in the early 1970s, and later, the AB 20 in 1975, followed by a number of other models. These designs were discontinued by Braun in 2005.

In the 1970s, a design approach influenced by pop-art began to inspire Braun products, which by this time included many common household appliances and products. Contemporary Braun design of the period incorporated this new approach in bright colours and a lightness of touch, while still clean-lined in keeping with functionalist philosophy.

For nearly 30 years Dieter Rams served as head of design for Braun A.G. until his retirement in 1995 when he was succeeded by Peter Schneider. Other designers who worked in Braun's design department include Gerd Alfred Muller, Reinhold Weiss, Richard Fischer, Robert Oberheim, Florian Seiffert, Hartwig Kahlcke, Herbert Hirche, Fritz Eichler, and Ludwig Littmann. Many of the designs that Rams and the Braun design department produced –  from coffee makes to calculators, and radios to razors – are held in the collections of museums around the world including the Museum of Modern Art in New York, the Pompidou Centre in Paris, and the Museum für Angewandte Kunst in Frankfurt.

Gallery

Notes

See also

References

Further reading
 Wolfgang Schmittel: Design, Concept, Realisation: Braun, Citroen, Miller, Olivetti, Sony, Swissair, Zurich 1975 
 Jo Klatt, Günter Staeffler: Braun+Design Collection. 40 Jahre Braun Design von 1955 bis 1995. Hamburg 1995
 Hans Wichmann: Mut zum Aufbruch. Erwin Braun 1921 bis 1992. München 1998
 Bernd Polster: Braun. 50 Years of Design and Innovationen 2009 (German edition, Cologne 2005)
 Less and More: The Design Ethos of Dieter Rams. Catalogue. Design Museum, London 2009
 Bernd Polster: Kronberg Meets Cupertino: What Braun and Apple really have in common. In: Apple Design, Hamburg 2011
 Check reviews of Braun Beard Trimmers on https://bestbeardtrimmer2021.com/ by David Dummit

External links

 

Electronics companies of Germany
Home appliance manufacturers of Germany
Home appliance manufacturers
German brands
Home appliance brands
Clock brands
Razor brands
Companies based in Hesse
Photography companies of Germany
Procter & Gamble brands
Design companies established in 1921
Manufacturing companies established in 1921
Technology companies established in 1921
1967 mergers and acquisitions
2005 mergers and acquisitions
De'Longhi
Industrial design
German subsidiaries of foreign companies
Kronberg im Taunus